The term "singleton" describes those who live in a single-person household, especially those who prefer the lifestyle of living alone. It was popularized by the Bridget Jones novels and films, but it is also used in sociology.

Patterns
Sociologist Eric Klinenberg reports that before the 1950s, no society had large numbers of people living alone. Historically, this has happened when elderly people outlive their spouses, and when men have migrated for work. In modern times, large numbers of people have begun to live happily alone in cities and with the help of communication technologies like the telephone, email, and social networking services. Klinenberg has found that the ability of women to work, own property, and initiate divorce creates more opportunities for living alone; in countries like Saudi Arabia where women do not have autonomy, few people live alone.

Single people may live alone before their first romantic partner, after separation, divorce, the end of a cohabiting relationship or after their partner has died. Couples, married or not, may maintain separate residences as an alternative to cohabitation in a long distance relationship, a temporary separation due to troubles in the relationship, or simply living apart together.

The number of singletons is correlated with how wealthy the country is. In wealthy countries, people are more likely to choose the privacy, individualism, and sometimes the loneliness of living alone. In poor countries, most people live in extended family groups, which provide material, social, and emotional support to each other, as well as imposing the responsibility of similarly caring for other family members.

See also
 Asexuality
 Asociality
 Hipster
 Incel
 Living apart together
 MGTOW
 Parasite single
 Recluse
 Sloane Ranger
 Single person
 Yuppie
 Young professional

References

External links
PopMatters

Postmodernism
Social class subcultures
Social groups
Subcultures
Youth culture